Munir-ur-Rehman (born 3 May 1993) is a Pakistani cricketer who plays for Islamabad. He made his first-class debut on 9 November 2015 in the 2015–16 Quaid-e-Azam Trophy.

References

External links
 

1993 births
Living people
Pakistani cricketers
Islamabad cricketers
Cricketers from Islamabad